Anti-Armenian sentiment, also known as anti-Armenianism and Armenophobia, is a diverse spectrum of negative feelings, dislikes, fears, aversion, racism, derision and/or prejudice towards Armenians, Armenia, and Armenian culture.

Historically, anti-Armenianism has manifested itself in several ways, ranging from expressions of hatred of or discrimination against individual Armenians to organized pogroms by mobs or state-sanctioned genocide. Notable instances of persecution include the Hamidean massacres (1894-1897), the Adana massacre (1909), the Armenian genocide (1915), the Sumgait pogrom (1988), and Operation Ring (1991).

Modern anti-Armenianism frequently consists of expressions of opposition to the actions or existence of an Armenian state, aggressive denial of the Armenian genocide or belief in an Armenian conspiracy to fabricate history and manipulate public and political opinion for political gain. Anti-Armenianism has also manifested as extrajudicial killing or intimidation of people of Armenian heritage and destruction of cultural monuments.

Turkey

Armenian genocide and its denial

Although it was possible for Armenians to achieve status and wealth in the Ottoman Empire, as a community they were never accorded more than "second-class citizen" status and were regarded as fundamentally alien to the Muslim character of Ottoman society. In 1895, revolts among the Armenian subjects of the Ottoman Empire in pursuit of equal treatment led to Sultan Abdül Hamid's decision to massacre tens of thousands of Armenians in the Hamidian massacres.

During World War I, the Ottoman government massacred between 1.2 and 1.8 million Armenians in the Armenian genocide.  The Turkish government continues to aggressively deny the Armenian genocide. This position has been criticized in a letter from the International Association of Genocide Scholars to – then Turkish Prime Minister, now President – Recep Tayyip Erdoğan.

Contemporary
Cenk Saraçoğlu argues that anti-Armenian attitudes in Turkey "are no longer constructed and shaped by social interactions between the 'ordinary people' ... Rather, the Turkish media and state promote and disseminate an overtly anti-Armenian discourse." According to a 2011 survey in Turkey, 73.9% of respondents admitted having unfavorable views toward Armenians. The survey showed an unfavorable stance toward Armenians was "relatively more widespread among those participants with lower levels of education and socioeconomic status." According to Minority Rights Group, while the government recognizes Armenians as a minority group, as used in Turkey this term denotes second-class status.

Hrant Dink, the editor of the weekly bilingual newspaper Agos, was assassinated in Istanbul on January 19, 2007, by Ogün Samast, who was reportedly acting on the orders of Yasin Hayal, a militant Turkish ultra-nationalist. For his statements on Armenian identity and the Armenian genocide, Dink had been prosecuted three times under Article 301 of the Turkish Penal Code for "insulting Turkishness". (The law was later amended by the Turkish parliament, changing "Turkishness" to "Turkish Nation" and making it more difficult to prosecute individuals for the said offense.) Dink had also received numerous death threats from Turkish nationalists who viewed his "iconoclastic" journalism (particularly regarding the Armenian genocide) as an act of treachery.

İbrahim Şahin and 36 other alleged members of Turkish ultra-nationalist Ergenekon group were arrested in January, 2009 in Ankara. The Turkish police said the roundup was triggered by orders Şahin gave to assassinate 12 Armenian community leaders in Sivas. According to the official investigation in Turkey, Ergenekon also had a role in the murder of Hrant Dink.

In 2002, a monument was erected in memory of Turkish-Armenian composer Onno Tunç in Yalova, Turkey. The monument to the composer of Armenian origin was subjected to much vandalism over the course of the years, in which unidentified people had taken out the letters on the monument. In 2012 Yalova Municipal Assembly decided to remove the monument. Bilgin Koçal, the former mayor of Yalova, informed the public that the memorial had been destroyed by time and that it would shortly be replaced with a new one in the memory of Tunç. On the other hand, a similar memorial stays in place at the village of Selimiye, where an aircraft had crashed; and the people in the village of 187 expressed their protest about the vandalism claims regarding the memorial in Yalova, adding that they paid from their own funds to keep up the maintenance of the monument in their village against the wearing effect of natural causes.

Sevag Balikci, a Turkish soldier of Armenian descent, was shot dead on April 24, 2011, the day of the commemoration of the Armenian genocide during his military service in Batman. It was later discovered that killer Kıvanç Ağaoğlu was an ultra-nationalist. Through his Facebook profile, it was uncovered that he was a sympathizer of nationalist politician Muhsin Yazıcıoğlu and Turkish agent / contract killer Abdullah Çatlı, who himself had a history of anti-Armenian activity, such as the Armenian Genocide Memorial bombing in a Paris suburb in 1984. His Facebook profile also showed that he was a Great Union Party (BBP) sympathizer, a far-right nationalist party in Turkey. Testimony given by Sevag Balıkçı's fiancée stated that he was subjected to psychological pressure at the military compound. She was told by Sevag over the phone that he feared for his life because a certain military serviceman threatened him by saying, "If war were to happen with Armenia, you would be the first person I would kill."

On February 26, 2012, on the anniversary of the Khojaly Massacre, the Atsız Youth led a demonstration took place in Istanbul which contained hate speech and threats towards Armenia and Armenians. Chants and slogans during the demonstration include: "You are all Armenian, you are all bastards", "bastards of Hrant [Dink] can not scare us", and "Taksim Square today, Yerevan Tomorrow: We will descend upon you suddenly in the night."

In 2012 the ultra-nationalist ASIM-DER group (founded in 2002) had targeted Armenian schools, churches, foundations and individuals in Turkey as part of an anti-Armenian hate campaign.

Azerbaijan

Anti-Armenian sentiment exists in Azerbaijan on institutional and social levels. Armenians are "the most vulnerable group in Azerbaijan in the field of racism and racial discrimination."

Throughout the 20th century, Armenian and the Turkish-speaking Muslim (Shia and Sunni; then known as "Caucasian Tatars" , later as Azerbaijanis) inhabitants of Transcaucasia  have been involved in numerous conflicts. Pogroms, massacres and wars solidified oppositional ethnic identities between the two groups, and have contributed to the development of national consciousnesses among both Armenians and Azeris. From 1918 to 1920, organized killings of Armenians occurred in Azerbaijan, especially in the Armenian cultural centers in Baku and Shusha.

Contemporary Armenophobia in Azerbaijan traces its roots to the last years of the Soviet Union, when Armenians demanded that the Soviet authorities transfer the mostly Armenian-populated Nagorno-Karabakh Autonomous Oblast (NKAO) in the Azerbaijan SSR to the Armenian SSR. In response to these demands, anti-Armenian rallies were held in various cities, where Azeri nationalist groups incited anti-Armenian sentiments that led to pogroms in Sumgait, Kirovabad and Baku. From 1988 through 1990, an estimated 300,000-350,000 Armenians either fled under threat of violence or were deported from Azerbaijan, and roughly 167,000 Azeris were forced to flee Armenia, often under violent circumstances. The rising tensions between the two nations eventually escalated into a large-scale military conflict over Nagorno-Karabakh, in which Azerbaijan lost control over around 14% of the country's territory to the self-proclaimed Nagorno-Karabakh Republic. Ever-increasing tensions over the loss of the territory, which sparked more anti-Armenian sentiment, and the urge to revenge the loss of the territory internationally recognized as Azeri led Azerbaijan to start the second war over the territory in 2020, in which they managed to recapture part of the area. In a November 2020 alert, Genocide Watch reported that Armenians in Azerbaijan are dehumanized, being called “terrorists”, “bandits,” “infidels,” “leftovers of the sword" (a referral to the 1915 genocide).

The Armenian side has accused the Azerbaijani government of carrying out anti-Armenian policy inside and outside the country, which includes propaganda of hate toward Armenia and Armenians and the destruction of Armenian cultural heritage. According to Fyodor Lukyanov, editor-in-chief of the journal Russia in Global Affairs, "Armenophobia is the institutional part of the modern Azerbaijani statehood and Karabakh is in the center of it". In 2011, the ECRI report on Azerbaijan stated that "the constant negative official and media discourse" against Armenia fosters "a negative climate of opinion regarding people of Armenian origin, who remain vulnerable to discrimination." According to historian Jeremy Smith, "National identity in post-Soviet Azerbaijan rests in large part, then, on the cult of the Alievs, alongside a sense of embattlement and victimisation and a virulent hatred of Armenia and Armenians".

In the European Parliament's resolution of 10 March 2022 condemning the destruction of the Armenian heritage in Artsakh (Nagorno-Karabakh), the parliament stated:

 European Parliament ... Acknowledges that the erasure of the Armenian cultural heritage is part of a wider pattern of a systematic, state-level policy of Armenophobia, historical revisionism and hatred towards Armenians promoted by the Azerbaijani authorities, including dehumanisation, the glorification of violence and territorial claims against the Republic of Armenia”. In March 2023, the European Parliament issued another resolution which condemned Azerbaijan's attacks on Armenia and called for Azerbaijan to lift its blockade of Artsakh. In response, Azerbaijani President Aliyev described the resolution as "beyond doubt...originat[ing] from Armenia and the Armenian Diaspora, long since a cancerous tumour of Europe."

Anti-Armenian hate crimes committed by Azerbaijanis have also occurred internationally beyond the country of Azerbaijan. In 2004, Ramil Safarov decapitated an Armenian while he was sleeping in Hungary.

Status of Armenian cultural monuments

In November 2020, newspaper The Guardian wrote about Azerbaijan's campaign of comprehensive "cultural cleansing" in Nakhichevan:

Satellite imagery, extensive documentary evidence and personal accounts showed that 89 churches, 5,840 khachkars and 22,000 tombstones were destroyed between 1997 and 2006, including the medieval necropolis of Djulfa, the largest ancient Armenian cemetery in the world. The Azerbaijani response has consistently been to simply deny that Armenians had ever lived in the region.

The most publicized case of mass destruction concerns gravestones at a medieval Armenian cemetery in Julfa, a sacred site of the Armenian Apostolic Church. Charles Tannock, the member of the foreign affairs committee of the European Parliament, argued: "This is very similar to the Buddha statues destroyed by the Taliban. They have concreted the area over and turned it into a military camp." The destruction of the cemetery has been widely described by Armenian sources, and some non-Armenian sources, as an act of cultural genocide.

European Parliament published a resolution on 10 March 2022, condemning the destruction of the Armenian heritage in Artsakh (Nagorno-Karabakh). The resolution read:

 European Parliament ... Strongly condemns Azerbaijan's continued policy of erasing and denying the Armenian cultural heritage in and around Nagorno-Karabakh, in violation of international law and the recent decision of the ICJ...

Ongoing genocide risk 
Since 2020, Azerbaijan has attacked Armenian positions in Nagorno-Karabakh (Second Nagorno-Karabakh War), Armenia (2022-2023 border crisis), and has also blockaded the Republic of Artsakh. These events have resulted in numerous organizations, including those which specialize in genocide studies, reporting that Armenians are at risk of being subjected to another genocide. The Lemkin Institute for Genocide Prevention considers Armenians to be "one of the most threatened identities in the world today." Sheila Paylan, international criminal lawyer and legal advisor to the United Nations has warned that  "The international community should take its R2P [Responsibility to Protect] commitments more seriously or risk becoming silently complicit in the next Armenian genocide—or ethnic cleansing." Caucasus expert Laurence Broers draws parallels between "the Russian discourse about Ukraine as an artificial, fake nation, and the Azerbaijani discourse about Armenia, likewise claiming it has a fake history", thereby elevating the conflict to an "existential level" for Armenians. A coalition of various human rights organizations also issued a collective genocide warning in response to the blockade: "All 14 risk factors for atrocity crimes identified by the UN Secretary-General's Office on Genocide Prevention are now present."

 The Lemkin Institute for Genocide Prevention – Since 2021, the organization has issued various "Red Flag Alerts" on Azerbaijan which the organization says poses a threat of genocide to Armenians. It described the Azerbaijan's blockade of the Republic of Artsakh as "a criminal act which intends to create terror and unbearable conditions of life for the population of Artsakh. These events are not isolated events; they are, instead, being committed within a larger genocidal pattern against Armenia and Armenians by the Azerbaijani regime." The group also wrote "The genocidal intent of Baku has never been clearer and the actions carried out up to the moment highly predict this outcome."
 Genocide Watch – issued its own genocide warnings in September 2020 saying that "Because of Azerbaijan’s invasion of Artsakh...Genocide Watch considers Azerbaijan to be at Stage 9: Extermination and at Stage 10: Denial. Genocide Watch considers that Azerbaijan's leadership may intend to forcibly deport the Armenian population of Artsakh by committing genocidal massacres that will terrorize Armenians into leaving Artsakh." In September 2022, Genocide Watch issued another alert stating, "Due to its unprovoked attacks and genocidal rhetoric against ethnic Armenians, Genocide Watch considers Azerbaijan's assault on Armenia and Artsakh to be at Stage 4: Dehumanization, Stage 7: Preparation, Stage 8: Persecution, and Stage 10: Denial."  
 The International Association of Genocide Scholars (IAGS) – issued similar statements in October 2020: "Direct Turkish involvement in the decades-long [Nagorno-Karabakh] conflict is ... a fact that threatens to annihilate Armenians in Artsakh and beyond. A recent statement issued by the Turkish president, Recep Tayyip Erdogan, read that they, Turkey, were going 'to continue to fulfill the mission of their grandfathers, which was carried out a century ago in the Caucasus'. This constitutes a direct threat of continuing the Armenian genocide that began in 1915...History, from the Armenian genocide to the last three decades of conflict, as well as current political statements, economic policies, sentiments of the societies and military actions by the Azerbaijani and Turkish leadership should warn us that genocide of the Armenians in Nagorno-Karabakh, and perhaps even Armenia, is a very real possibility." In October 2022, the IAGS issued another statement condeming Azerbaijan's September 2022 attacks on the Republic of Armenia: "Significant genocide risk factors exist in the Nagorno-Karabakh situation concerning the Armenian population" and "dehumanizing and other [irredentist] statements [from Azerbaijani government officials] demonstrate the existence of a risk of genocide, and may amount to incitement to genocide and possibly other international crimes."

Russia

A 19th-century Russian explorer, Vasili Lvovich Velichko, who was active during the period when the Russian tzarism carried out a purposeful anti-Armenian policy, wrote "Armenians are the extreme instance of brachycephaly; their actual racial instinct make them naturally hostile to the State."

According to a 2012 VTSIOM opinion research, 6% of respondents in Moscow and 3% in Saint Petersburg were "experiencing feelings of irritation, hostility" toward Armenians. In the 2000s there have been racist murders of Armenians in Russia. In 2002 an explosion took place in Krasnodar near the Armenian church which the local community believed was a terrorist act.

Georgia

In the late 19th century and early 20th century anti-Armenian sentiment was prevalent in both socialist and nationalist Georgian circles. The economic dominance of Armenians in Tbilisi fueled verbal attacks on Armenians. Droeba, an influential journal, described Armenians as people who "strip our streets and fatten their pockets" and "but the last piece of property from our indebted peasant families." Both Ilia Chavchavadze and Akaki Tsereteli, two major literary figures, attacked Armenians for their perceived mercantilism. Tsereteli portrayed Armenians as a flea sucking Georgian blood in one fable. Chavchavadze denounced Armenians for "eating the bread baked by someone else or drinking that which is creating by another's sweat." Chavchavadze's newspaper, Iveria, depicted Armenians as "sly moneylenders and unscrupulous traders", according to Stephen F. Jones. The Social Democratic Party of Georgia (Georgian Mensheviks) attacked the bourgeoisie and imperialism to liberate Georgia from both Russian imperialism and perceived Armenian economic exploitation. During the existence of the Democratic Republic of Georgia (1918–21), the independent Georgian government saw Armenians as a potential "fifth column" for their supposed loyalty to the First Republic of Armenia and subject to manipulation by foreign powers. The Georgian–Armenian War of December 1918 increased anti-Armenian sentiments in Georgia. In post-Soviet Georgia, first president Zviad Gamsakhurdia, an outspoken nationalist, viewed Armenians, along with other ethnic minorities, as "guests" or "aliens" who threaten Georgia's territorial integrity.

Joseph Stalin wrote in his 1913 essay Marxism and the National Question:

Around the time of the 2007 parliamentary elections in the breakaway region of Abkhazia, the Georgian media emphasized the factor of ethnic Armenians in the area. The Georgian newspaper Sakartvelos Respublika predicted that much of the parliament would be Armenian and that there was even a chance of an Armenian president being elected. The paper also reported that the Abkhazian republic might already be receiving financial assistance from Armenians living in the United States.
Some Armenian analysts believe such reports are attempting to create conflict between Armenians and ethnic Abkhazians to destabilize the region.

A policy of desecration of Armenian churches and historical monuments on the territory of Georgia has actively been pursued. On November 16, 2008, Georgian monk Tariel Sikinchelashvili vandalised the graves of patrons of art Mikhail and Lidia Tamamshev. The Armenian Church of Norashen in Tbilisi, built in the middle of the 15th century, has been desecrated and misappropriated by the Georgian government despite the fact that both Armenia's and Georgia's Prime-Ministers have reached an agreement on not to maltreat the church. Due to no law on religion, the status of Surb Norashen, Surb Nshan, Shamhoretsor Surb Astvatsatsin (Karmir Avetaran), Yerevanots Surb Minas and Mugni Surb Gevorg in Tbilisi and Surb Nshan in Akhaltsikhe is unknown since being confiscated during the Soviet era. Armenians in Georgia and Armenia have demonstrated against the destruction. On November 28, 2008, Armenian demonstrators in front of the Georgian embassy in Armenia demanded that the Georgian government immediately cease encroachments on the Armenian churches and punish those guilty, calling the Georgian party's actions "white genocide".

In August, 2011, Georgia's Culture Minister Nika Rurua sacked director Robert Sturua as head of the Tbilisi national theatre for "xenophobic" comments he made earlier this year, officials reported. "We are not going to finance xenophobia. Georgia is a multicultural country", Rurua said. Provoking public outrage, Sturua said in an interview with local news agency that "Saakashvili doesn't know what Georgian people need because he is Armenian." "I do not want Georgia to be governed by a representative of a different ethnicity", he added.

In July 2014, the Armenian Ejmiatsin Church in Tbilisi was attacked. The Armenian diocese said it was "a crime committed on ethnic and religious grounds."

In 2018 the Tandoyants Armenian church in Tbilisi was gifted to the Georgian Orthodox Patriarchate. The Diocese of the Armenian Apostolic Holy Orthodox Church in Georgia stated that the church was "illegally transferred" to the Georgian Patriarchate. According to the Human Rights Education and Monitoring Center, Tandoyants is not the only historic Armenian church the Georgian Patriarchate has targeted. There are at least six others the Patriarchate has its sights set on.

United States

Early 20th century
There has been historic prejudice against Armenians in the United States throughout various times, at least beginning from the early 1900s.

In early 1900s Armenians were among the group of minorities who were barred from loaning money, land, and equipment particularly because of their race. They were referred to as "lower class Jews". Moreover, in Fresno, California, among other minorities Armenians lived on one side of Van Ness Blvd., while the residents of European white origin lived on the other side. A deed from one home there stated, "Neither said premises nor any part thereof shall be used in any matter whatsoever or occupied by any Black, Chinese, Japanese, Hindu, Armenian, Asiatic or native of the Turkish Empire."

Between the 1920s and the 1960s, some houses in the Rock Creek Hills neighborhood of Kensington, a suburb of Washington, D.C., included anti-Armenian language in racial covenants that were part of property deeds. One deed in Rock Creek Hills declared that homes in the neighborhood "shall never be used or occupied by...negroes or any person or persons, of negro blood or extraction, or to any person of the Semitic Race, blood or origin, or Jews, Armenians, Hebrews, Persians and Syrians, except...partial occupancy of the premises by domestic servants."

In Anny Bakalian's book Armenian-Americans: From Being to Feeling Armenian, various groups of Armenians were polled for discrimination based on their identity. Roughly 77% of US-born Armenians felt they were discriminated in getting a job while 80% responded positively to a question whether they felt discriminated in getting admitted to a school.

American historian Justin McCarthy is known for his controversial view that no genocide was intended by the Ottoman Empire but that both Armenians and Turks died as the result of civil war. Some attribute his denial of the Armenian genocide to anti-Armenianism, as he holds an honorary doctorate of the Turkish Boğaziçi University and he is also a board member of the Institute of Turkish Studies.

Since the 1990s
On April 24, 1998, during a campus exhibit organized by the Armenian Students' Association at UC Berkeley,  Hamid Algar, a Professor of Islamic & Persian Studies, reportedly approached a group of organizers and shouted, "It was not a genocide but I wish it was—you lying pigs!" The students also claimed that Algar also spit at them. Following the incident members of the Armenian Students' Association filed a report with campus police calling for an investigation. After a five-month investigation the Chancellor's office issued an apology, though no hate charges were filed as incident did not create a "hostile environment". On March 10, 1999, the Associated Students of University of California (ASUC) passed a resolution titled,  "A Bill Against Hate Speech and in Support of Reprimand for Prof. Algar", condemning the incident and calling for Chancellor to review the University decision not to file charges.

In 1999, after Rafi Manoukian got elected to Glendale City Council, one resident attended the council's meetings every week to "tell Armenians to go back where they came from." Manoukian campaign had made a point to galvanize Glendale's large Armenian American electorate.

In April 2007, the Los Angeles Times Managing Editor Douglas Frantz blocked a story on the Armenian genocide written by Mark Arax, allegedly citing the fact Arax was of Armenian descent and therefore had a biased opinion on the subject. Arax, who has published similar articles before, has lodged a discrimination complaint and threatened a federal lawsuit. Frantz, who did not cite any specific factual errors in the article, is accused of having a bias obtained while being stationed in Istanbul, Turkey. Harut Sassounian, an Armenian community leader, accused Frantz of having expressed support for denial of the Armenian genocide and has stated he personally believed that Armenians rebelled against the Ottoman Empire, an argument commonly used to justify the killings. Frantz resigned from the paper not long afterward, possibly due to the mounting requests for his dismissal from the Armenian community.

In March 2012 three of five Glendale Police Department's officers of Armenian origin filed a lawsuit in Los Angeles County Superior Court against Glendale Police Department claiming racial discrimination.

Another incident that received less coverage was a series of hate mail campaigns directed at Paul Krekorian, a city council candidate for Californian Democratic Primary, making racist remarks and accusations that the Armenian community was engaging in voter fraud.

In 2016, during a race between Glendale City Clerk Ardy Kassakhian and Glendale Council Member Laura Friedman for the 43rd District Assembly seat, Kassakhian's campaign faced numerous threats and criticism based on the candidate's ethnicity. At one point in the campaign Kassakhian's office was evacuated after receiving a phone call that threatened the safety of employees and volunteers.

On April 20, 2016, Armenian genocide denial propaganda appeared in the sky over the Hudson River between Manhattan and Northern New Jersey. The skywriting featured messages such as "101 years of Geno-lie", "BFF = Russia + Armenia", and "FactCheckArmenia.com". The aerial stunt was part of a campaign by the website Fact Check Armenia, an Armenian genocide denialist site. The writing could be seen from roughly a 15-mile (24 km) radius. The media attention from the incident resulted in an official apology by the skywriting company.

In the 4th episode of Season 3 of the CBS sitcom 2 Broke Girls (aired on October 14, 2013) "when a new cappuccino maker is brought into the cupcake store by a co-worker, he says he bought it for a cheap price from a person who stole it but sells it at a profit, adding 'it's the Armenian way.' When the character is pressed that he is not Armenian, he says 'I know. But, it's the Armenian way. This scene was characterized as "racist" by Asbarez Editor Ara Khachatourian, who criticized CBS for promotion of racial stereotypes in their shows.

In the January 9, 2018, episode of the Comedy Central late-night program The Daily Show Trevor Noah stated: "This is, like, really funny. Only Donald Trump could defend himself and, in the same sentence, completely undermine his whole point. It would be like someone saying, 'I'm the most tolerant guy out there, just ask this filthy Armenian. Armenian American organizations criticized Noah for alleged racism against Armenians. In a joint press release the Armenian Bar Association and the Armenian Rights Watch Committee (ARWC) compared "Filthy Armenians" to other offensive racial epithets, which although "may have been intended to coax a laugh from the audience by ridiculing President Trump's self-proclaimed genius and tolerance", constitutes "affront and slander". The organizations called for The Daily Show and Trevor Noah to issue a retraction and an apology. The Armenian National Committee of America (ANCA) also called for an apology.

In July 2020 the KZV Armenian School and its adjacent Armenian Community Center in San Francisco were vandalized overnight with threatening and racist graffiti. According to San Francisco officials, the attack claimed to support a violent, anti-Armenian movement led by Azerbaijan. The messages contained curse words and appeared to be connected to increased tensions between Azerbaijan and Armenia. The Speaker of the United States House of Representatives Nancy Pelosi noted that "The KZV Armenian School is a part of the beautiful fabric of our San Francisco family. The hateful defacing of this place of community and learning is a disgrace." San Francisco District Attorney Chesa Boudin and San Francisco Mayor London Breed also condemned the hate act.

On September 24, 2021, the St. Peter Armenian Church in Fernando Valley, California, was vandalized. The suspect broke eight very rare stained glass windows of the church with a baseball bat. The ANCA-WR Executive Director Armen Sahakyan said “This act of vandalism is especially concerning as we recently marked one year since the Armenophobic hate crimes that took place in San Francisco.”. The Los Angeles Police Department continues its investigation on this crime.

In the 2022 Los Angeles City Council scandal, Nury Martinez referred to Areen Ibranossian, an advisor to councillor Paul Krekorian, as "The guy with one eyebrow." Martinez wasn't able to recall the last name and Cedillo replied "It ends in i-a-n, I bet you." Ibranossian said, "This type of depiction of Armenians is not uncommon and is too often tolerated." Growing up in Torrance, California, he was called "towel head" and "camel jockey."

Israel 

Israel-Armenia relations have been complicated throughout history, resulting in anti-Armenian sentiments in Israel.

The Jerusalem Post reported in 2009 that out of all Christians in Jerusalem's Old City Armenians were most often spat on by Haredi and Orthodox Jews. In 2011 several instances of spitting and verbal attacks on Armenian clergymen by Haredi Jews were reported in the Old City. In a 2013 interview Armenian Patriarch of Jerusalem Nourhan Manougian stated that Armenians in Israel are treated as "third-class citizens". In 2019, it was reported that 60 Armenian Church students attempted to lynch two Jewish men on the eve of Shavuot in Jerusalem, further increasing tensions between the religious groups.

Israel has long refused to recognized the Armenian Genocide, mainly to avoid harming its relations with Turkey. Former President and Prime Minister of Israel Shimon Peres referred to the history of the Armenian Genocide as "meaningless" and said that "We reject attempts to create a similarity between the Holocaust and the Armenian allegations. Nothing similar to the Holocaust occurred. It is a tragedy what the Armenians went through but not a genocide." Other major figures and organizations in Israel have also propped up Turkey's genocide denial. In particular, the Turkish Israeli and Azerbaijani Israeli communities have encouraged genocide denial in Israel.  The Knesset Committee on Education, Culture and Sports recognized the Armenian Genocide on August 1, 2016. When Visiting the Israeli President the Armenian Patriarchate of Jerusalem on May 9, 2016, Reuven Rivlin concluded his speech by saying that "the Armenians were massacred in 1915. My parents remember thousands of Armenian migrants finding asylum at the Armenian Church. No one in Israel denies that an entire nation was massacred. Recognition of the Armenian Genocide in Israel remains to be an extremely contentious issue influenced heavily by Azerbaijan-Israel Relations.

Israel's strategic alliance with Azerbaijan and Armenia's alliance with Iran have both resulted in hostility between the Israeli and Armenian governments and the subsequent deterioration of Armenia-Israel relations. In both the First and Second Nagorno-Karabakh Wars, Israel has supplied Azerbaijan with advanced weaponry. At a protest against Israel's arms sales to Azerbaijan, counter-protesters smashed a protester's car and blocked the road they were driving along. Many Israelis have also sympathized with Azerbaijan due to Azerbaijan's long and peaceful historical relations with Jews. Because of strong relations between Israel and Azerbaijan, pro-Israeli lobbying groups such as AIPAC have defended and lobbied for Azerbaijan against Armenia.

Others

Pakistan

Pakistan is the only United Nations member state that has not recognized the Republic of Armenia, citing its support to Azerbaijan in the Nagorno-Karabakh conflict.

Tajikistan
In early 1990, 39 Armenian refugees from Azerbaijan were settled in Tajikistan. False rumors spread that allegedly up to 5,000 Armenians were being resettled in new housing in Dushanbe experiencing acute housing shortage at that time. This led to riots which targeted both the Communist government and Armenians. The Soviet Ministry of Interior (MVD) suppressed the demonstrations, during which more than 20 people were killed and over 500 were injured.

Ukraine
In 1944, in the town of Kuty in eastern Poland, Ukrainian nationalists from the OUN-UPA massacred (as part of the Massacres of Poles in Volhynia and Eastern Galicia) Armenians and Poles, killing 200 people. Kuty was the largest concentration of Armenians in Poland.

In 2009, an ethnic conflict broke out in the city of Marhanets following the murder of a Ukrainian man by an Armenian. A fight between Ukrainians and Armenians started in the "Scorpion" café, and later turned into riots and pogroms against Armenians, accompanied by the burning of houses and cars, which led to exodus of Armenians from the city.

East Turkestan
Uyghur separatist leader Isa Alptekin spouted anti-Armenian rhetoric while he was in Turkey and stated that innocent Turkish Muslims were massacred by Armenians.

See also
 List of anti-Armenian massacres
 Anti-Oriental Orthodox sentiment
 Anti-Assyrian sentiment
 Persecution of Eastern Orthodox Christians

Notes

References

Further reading
 Hilmar Kaiser: Imperialism, Racism, and Development Theories. The Construction of a Dominant Paradigm on Ottoman Armenians, Gomidas Institute, Ann Arbor (MI) 1997

Richard Albrecht, «nous voulons une Arménie sans Arméniens». Drei Jahrzehnte Armenierbilder in kolonial-imperialistischen und totalitär-faschistischen Diskursen in Deutschland, 1913–1943 page 625 Schweizerische Zeitschrift für Religions- und Kulturgeschichte 106 (2012)

 
Armenian
Racism